National Institute of Technology Meghalaya (NIT Meghalaya or NITM) is one of the National Institutes of Technology. It is in Shillong, Meghalaya, India. Classes were started in 2010 at the Sardar Vallabhbhai National Institute of Technology, Surat.

History
The institute is one among the 31 NITs in India established as Institutions of National Importance with funding from the Ministry of Human Resource Development, government of India.

The institute was set up by the Ministry of Human Resource Development by the NIT Act in 2010. The foundation stone of NIT Meghalaya at Sohra (Cherrapunjee) was laid by then Union Minister for IT and Human Resource Development Kapil Sibal in October 2012.

Campus
The institute presently functions from a temporary campus at the Bijni Complex in Laitumkhrah, Shillong, of the North Eastern Hill University.

The institute has been allotted a plot of land of about 300 acres (another 73 acres are to be added soon) at 25° 15' 22.00" N, 91° 44' 40.00" E in Sohra (Cherrapunjee) in the East Khasi Hills district of Meghalaya for its permanent campus which is going to shift shorty (maybe in another 3-4 years). NIT Meghalaya proposes to construct a modern state-of-the-art campus to accommodate all its requirements so that logistics are minimized while the built structures are in harmony with the surroundings. The Union Ministry of Human Resource Development (HRD) has awarded the contract for construction of the permanent campus to the Central Public Works Department (CPWD). Phase I of constructions in Sohra campus which is expected to complete at the earliest by 2021 shall tentatively include the following:

Buildings

25,000 sqm academic and administrative buildings
Boys hostels for a capacity of 1500
 Girls hostel(s) for a capacity of 400
 120 residences of various categories
 100-room guest house
Health centre
1500-capacity auditorium
Indoor stadium

Utilities
Power sub-station
Reservoir for rainwater harvesting
Water supply network
Roads and drains
Basic landscaping

The estimated expenditure in Phase I is about Rs. 300 crores.

Academics

The institute admitted its first batch of B.Tech students in July 2010 and the first two batches carried out their studies in the mentor institute, SVNIT Surat till December 2012. The academic activities of the institute in Meghalaya started in Shillong at the Bijni Complex of the North Eastern Hill University, in the city, with the admission of the third batch in July 2012.

Admissions to the B.Tech program are based on JEE (Main) conducted by the Central Board of Secondary Education (CBSE) and through the counseling conducted by the Central Seat Allocation Board (CSAB).

M.Tech started from 2014 session. The Doctor of Philosophy (Ph.D.) programme was started in August 2013.

MSc program in chemistry and physics started from 2015. Admission to MSc takes place through JAM.

Rankings

NIT Meghalaya was ranked 61 in the National Institutional Ranking Framework (NIRF) engineering ranking of 2020.

Central Library
The Central Library houses titles in Engineering, Technology, Sciences, Humanities and Social Sciences and Management. It has a collection of around 13,000 text and reference books and electronic resources. In addition to this, the library provides access to the Digital Library of ACM, IEEE and ASME.

Departments

Mechanical Engineering (ME)

The Department of Mechanical Engineering started from July 2013. The department offers a four-year (eight-semester) B.Tech programme in Mechanical Engineering with an initial intake capacity of 30. From 2014, the department has started the PhD programme in the area of Design & Manufacturing in Mechanical Engineering, Application of Soft Computing Techniques in Machining, Computational Fluid Dynamics, Turbulence Modeling, Fluid Mechanics etc.

The department is planning to start M.Tech programme in near future. It offers common courses for first year students in Engineering Mechanics, Basic Thermodynamics and Workshop Practice. The main objective of the department is to cater the students with class tutorial and in hand practice with state-of-the-art laboratories and workshop.

Computer Science & Engineering (CSE)
The department of Computer Science & Engineering, NIT Meghalaya offers B.Tech degrees in Computer Science and Engineering discipline. This programme is perhaps the most popular in NIT Meghalaya, with a maximum intake of 30 students per year.

The department is actively involved in research activities.

The department started its MTech program from 2014 with an initial intake of 20. There is a PhD programme under which research scholars are admitted twice a year.

Electrical & Electronics Engineering (EEE)
The Department of Electrical Engineering started since the inception of NIT Meghalaya. It offers B.Tech, M.Tech and PhD program. The B.Tech program started in 2010 with an intake of 30 students and since 2014 onward M.Tech program has been started with an intake of 20 students offering specialization in Power & Energy Systems.

There are full-time and part-time research scholars, registered for its PhD program.

The department aims to impart education and carry out fundamental and industry-oriented research. The research interest of faculties encompass areas of electrical engineering such as deregulated power system, soft computing application in power system control, voltage stability alleviation under deregulated environment, power electronics and drives, control system and instrumentation, mechatronics, embedded system, non-conventional energy system, high-voltage engineering, etc.

The department has laboratory facilities for students such as Electro-Technique Lab, Electrical Machine Lab, Network and Systems lab, Digital Electronics Lab, Power System Simulation Lab, Control & Instrumentation Lab, Power Electronics & Drives Lab, Microprocessor Lab, Microcontroller & Embedded Systems Lab. Specialised simulation software like Power Factory 14.1 (DIgSILENT), PSIM (Power Simulator), PSS@E (Power System Simulator for Engineers) are available with the department to develop the computing efficiency of the students and to carry out research.

Electronics & Communication Engineering (ECE)
The Department of Electronics and Communication Engineering caters to all areas of electronics engineering such as integrated electronics and circuits, telecommunications and computer technology. The department is equipped with laboratories catering to the basic training and research needs of its students.

The department offers Bachelor of Technology (B.Tech) programme and has initiated a Ph.D. programme.

Civil Engineering (CE)

NIT Meghalaya's Civil Engineering department first began its session from July 2012. The department, with an intake capacity of 30 students, offers afour-year (eight semesters) B.Tech programme in Civil Engineering.

Since 2014, the Civil Engineering Department has initiated the Ph.D programme on Environmental and Structural Engineering to equip the students on environment safeguards and be competent on their know-how on safe and secure constructions in tune with the changing nature, including disasters such as earthquakes, drought and floods.
Additionally, the department is planning to start an M.Tech programme in the near future.

Currently, the department is offering common courses for first year students in Engineering Drawing and Environmental Science.

Humanities & Social Science
The Department of Humanities and Social Sciences hosts disciplines like English Language and Literature, European Literature in Translation, Classical Greek Literature, Abnormal Psychology, General Management, Marketing Management, Financial Management, Human Resource Management and Operations Management.

Physics
The Department of Physics was established in 2010. It has actively imparted education to the students of B.Tech first and second years in theoretical aspects of areas along with related experiments to provide greater understanding of the subjects that would help them to become better engineers. The PhD programme in is successfully running in the domain of Material Science with special emphasis on Liquid Crystals, Metal Oxide semiconductors, Semiconductors nanostructure and devices and sensors. The department has an M.Sc. programme from the 2015-2016 session with special emphasis on the applied aspects of physics.

Chemistry
The Department of Chemistry started in 2012. In addition to a B.Tech Chemistry course, the department is offering M.Sc. from 2015 onwards with all the major areas of Chemistry such as Inorganic, Organic, Physical, and Quantum Chemistry. It is offering PhD programs in broad area of chemical Sciences like Organic Chemistry, Inorganic Chemistry, Biophysical Chemistry, Materials Chemistry and Computational Chemistry.

Mathematics
The Department of Mathematics started in June 2012. Currently the department offers two-year M.Sc. and PhD programmes. In addition, the department plays an important role as a supporting department to B.Tech and M.Tech programmes of the institute.

Student life
NIT Meghalaya organizes two major college fests—Cognitia, technical fest, and Shishir, cultural fest—in an academic year. Besides these, the college organizes sports fest.

There is a student council to preside student affairs which is elected through voting by students every year.

Hostels
NIT Meghalaya provides separate hostels for boys and girls to many of its outstation candidates. The hostels are provided with basic facilities. The hostels have internet facility. Adequate bus facility has been extended for commutates of students staying at hostels.

See also
 Malaviya National Institute of Technology Jaipur
 National Institute of Technology, Manipur
 National Institute of Technology, Patna
 Sardar Vallabhbhai National Institute of Technology, Surat

References

  

National Institutes of Technology
Engineering colleges in Meghalaya
2010 establishments in Meghalaya
Educational institutions established in 2010